Cristian Alexander Jiménez Martínez (born April 26, 1995) is a Guatemalan football player who currently plays as a defender for Liga Nacional club  Antigua.

International career
Jiménez received his first call up to the Guatemala senior squad in February 2016, to play a friendly against Honduras. During a 2018 FIFA World Cup qualifying game against Trinidad and Tobago, he was sent off in the 84th minute for dragging back forward Joevin Jones.

References

External links
 
 

Guatemalan footballers
Guatemala international footballers
1995 births
Living people
Association football defenders
2015 CONCACAF U-20 Championship players
C.S.D. Municipal players
Antigua GFC players